Kathrine Kleveland (born 7 April 1966) is a Norwegian politician.

From 2014 she chaired the organization No to the EU. She was elected representative to the Storting from the constituency of Vestfold for the period 2021–2025, for the Centre Party.

References

1966 births
Living people
Centre Party (Norway) politicians
Vestfold politicians
Members of the Storting
Women members of the Storting